Anahí is a Mexican actress and singer.

Anahí may also refer to:

 Anahí (album), a 1993 album by Anahí
 Anahí de Cárdenas, a Peruvian actress, model, dancer and singer
 María Dora "Anahí" Sánchez, a former Argentine Senator
 Anahi, from Guarani ana-i “cockspur coral tree (Erythrina crista-galli)”.